Raleigh Township is located in Saline County, Illinois. As of the 2010 census, its population was 1,186 and it contained 632 housing units.

Geography

Demographics

References

External links
City-data.com
Illinois State Archives

Townships in Saline County, Illinois
Townships in Illinois